{{DISPLAYTITLE:Tau9 Eridani}}

Tau9 Eridani (τ9 Eri) is a binary star in the constellation Eridanus. It is visible to the naked eye with an apparent visual magnitude of 4.63. The distance to this system can be estimated using the parallax method, which yields a value of roughly 327 light years.

This is a single-lined spectroscopic binary system with an orbital period of 5.95382 days and an eccentricity of 0.12. It is an Alpha² Canum Venaticorum variable with a rotational periodicity of 5.954 days.

The primary component Tau9 Eridani A has an estimated 326% the mass of the Sun and 3.1 times the Sun's radius. It shines with 166 times the solar luminosity from an outer atmosphere at an effective temperature of 10,866 K. The star is spinning with a projected rotational velocity of 30 km/s. The secondary star, designated Tau9 Eridani B, is a late A-type or early F-type star with a mass of 1.6 solar masses and an effective temperature of 7530 K.

References

B-type main-sequence stars
Ap stars
Eridanus (constellation)
Eridani, Tau9
Eridani, 36
025267
018673
01240
Durchmusterung objects
Alpha2 Canum Venaticorum variables
Spectroscopic binaries